Jimmy Kuo (born 17 October 1955) is a Taiwanese politician.

Education
Kuo graduated from the Affiliated Senior High School of National Taiwan Normal University and earned a degree from National Cheng Kung University.

Political career
Kuo served one term on the Taiwan Provincial Consultative Council. He left to lead the Democratic Progressive Party's organization and development department. Within the DPP, Kuo was affiliated with the New Tide faction. In 2001, Kuo was elected to the Legislative Yuan for the first time. He was reelected in 2004. During his legislative tenure, Kuo was often critical of the National Communications Commission.

Kuo lost to Yang Chiung-ying in the 2008 legislative elections, and was defeated by Johnny Chiang in 2012. By 2016, Kuo was chairman of the Taiwan Water Corporation. He resigned from Taiwater in January 2019.

References

1955 births
Living people
Taichung Members of the Legislative Yuan
Members of the 5th Legislative Yuan
Members of the 6th Legislative Yuan
Democratic Progressive Party Members of the Legislative Yuan
National Cheng Kung University alumni